The German minority in Paraguay came into existence with immigration during the industrial age. The "Nueva Germania" colony was founded in Paraguay in 1888; though regarded as a failure, it still exists despite being abandoned by many of its founders in the 1890s. Paraguay was a popular place for German leaders accused of war crimes to retreat after the second World War. There are large communities of German descendants living in the department of Guairá, in a town called (Colonia Independencia), the department of Itapúa, mainly in the Departmental Capital, Encarnación and the German towns of Obligado, Bella Vista and Hohenau. Some recent Brazilian immigrants to Paraguay also have German ancestry (Brasiguayos). Notable Paraguayans of German descent include the former president of Paraguay Alfredo Stroessner.

Russian Mennonites

Another large group of Germanic people who immigrated to Paraguay are Plautdietsch-speaking Russian Mennonites, people of Dutch and Prussian ancestry who immigrated to Russia under the rule of Czarina Catherine the Great. The Paraguayan Mennonite community left Russia in two waves: the first in the 19th century when their exemption from military service ended, and the second to avoid Stalin's collectivization programs. Russian Mennonites are different from another German-Russian group, the Volga Germans, through religion, ethnicity, and reasons for immigrating to Russia. Russian Mennonites are religious Mennonites while the Volga Germans are religious Lutherans and Roman Catholics. Russian Mennonites are ethnically Dutch and went to Russia for purposes of freedom of worship, while the Volga Germans went for economic reasons and land.

When the Communists came to power in Russia, the German-speaking population were persecuted by the new government. Some Russian Mennonites saw Paraguay as a perfect place to settle because it looked isolated. The government of Paraguay wanted more people to settle in the Chaco region, which was under dispute with its southern neighbor Argentina and its western neighbor Bolivia. The move to Paraguay was difficult for the Russian Mennonites, because they were new to the climate. Some of them left Paraguay for neighboring Argentina, where they met many Volga Germans, who had decided to settle in Argentina to escape the persecution in Russia. However, the situation changed, and the Russian Mennonites began to prosper in Paraguay.

The Russian Mennonites settled in the Boquerón Department in Paraguay. They established the Fernheim Colony, which includes the town of Filadelfia; Neuland Colony; and Menno Colony. Descendants of the Russian Mennonite immigrants continue to live in these colonies.

Education
German schools:
Deutsche Schule, Asunción
Colegio Aleman Concordia, Asunción
Colegio Gutenberg, Asunción

Historic German schools:
 Deutsche Schulen Alto-Parana-Gebiet
 Deutsche Schulen, Zentralschule Filadelfia, and Lehrerseminar Filadelfia Kolonie Fernheim
 Deutsche Schulen and Zentralschule (Kolonie Friesland)
 Deutsche Schulen (Kolonie Independencia)
 Deutsche Schulen, Vereinschule Loma Plata, and Lehrerfortbildungsanstalt Loma Plata (Kolonie Menno)
 Deutsche Schulen and Zentralschule Halbstadt (Kolonie Neuland)
 Deutsche Schule and Zentralschule Tiefenbrunn(Kolonie Volendam)

See also

 Demographics of Paraguay
 German Brazilian (see also: Riograndenser Hunsrückisch)
 German Argentine
 Germany–Paraguay relations

References

 
Immigration to Paraguay
Paraguay

Ethnic groups in Paraguay